Nyctemera carissima is a moth of the family Erebidae first described by Charles Swinhoe in 1891. It is found in China (Zhejiang, Guangdong, Fujian, Hunan), north-eastern India, Nepal, Thailand, Malay Peninsula, Indonesia (northern Sumatra) and Myanmar.

References

Nyctemerina
Moths described in 1891